R-Motorsport is a Swiss motor racing team founded in 2015. The team race Aston Martins as they are affiliated with the dealership in Sankt Gallen; the only one in Switzerland.

History
Founded in late 2015, R-Motorsport would spend its formative years as part of a tie-up with parent company AF Racing AG and Red Bull Advanced Technologies working on the Aston Martin Valkyrie before entering the Blancpain Endurance Series in 2018. The team found success quickly, winning just their second race at Silverstone with Jake Dennis, Nicki Thiim and Matthieu Vaxivière – aiding the trio to 13th in the championship. The team then went on to represent the Aston Martin marque at the 2019 Bathurst 12 Hour, and in the last race for the V12 Vantage scored a shock pole position and second placing.

HWA Racelab would then coax the Swiss squad into the Deutsche Tourenwagen Masters to replace their outgoing Mercedes-Benz association for 2019. The Vantage DTM broke cover just days before their pre-season team test in Jerez having been built in less than 100 days due to time constraints. Despite Paul di Resta's third-place in the first qualifying session at the Hockenheimring, all four cars struggled with copious mechanical problems. Daniel Juncadella scored the team's best result of sixth at the first race in Nuremberg, with Di Resta on course for a surprise win at Brands Hatch before he was falsely penalised for jumping the start. R-Motorsport and HWA – the engine builder for the program – would point the blame at each other for the poor season, withdrawing from the DTM's joint race with Super GT at Fuji Speedway in November before the partnership eventually split. With both entities owning vehicle IP, Aston Martin was withdrawn from the DTM ahead of 2020 and all four cars were sold to a Hong Kong buyer. The team continued their GT program in conjunction with their DTM entry, with Dennis, Marvin Kirchhöfer and Alex Lynn scoring a podium in the team's last race of the year.

2020 began with a two-car assault on the Bathurst 12 Hour, but only one car started the race after Kirchhöfer flipped the #62 car in qualifying. Dennis, Scott Dixon and Rick Kelly finished the race 16th outright, two laps down.

Results

GT World Challenge Europe Endurance Series results

Deutsche Tourenwagen Masters results

3 – One point for 3rd in qualifying.
† – Did not finish, but was classified having completed 90% of the race distance.

Complete Bathurst 12 Hour results

References

External links
Official website

Swiss auto racing teams
Blancpain Endurance Series teams
Deutsche Tourenwagen Masters teams
Auto racing teams established in 2015